Calpenia saundersi is a tiger moth in the family Erebidae first described by Frederic Moore in 1872. It is found in India.

References

External links

Callimorphina
Moths described in 1872
Moth genera
Moths of Asia